Jayezan-e Kohneh (also Romanized as Jāyezān-e Kohneh and Jāyzānkohneh; also known as Jāizān and Jāyezān) is a village in Jayezan Rural District, Jayezan District, Omidiyeh County, Khuzestan Province, Iran. At the 2006 census, its population was 318, in 63 families.

References 

Populated places in Omidiyeh County